The Royal Miramare Theatre was a theatre located at Martyrs' Square (formerly Green Square) built in 1925 in Tripoli, Libya. It was located next to the Red Castle.  In the 1950s, the theatre was the centre of theatrical activity in Libya. It was demolished in the late 1960s by Muammar Gaddafi, who became Libya's autocratic ruler in 1969.

See also

List of buildings and structures in Libya

Buildings and structures demolished in the 1960s
Buildings and structures in Tripoli, Libya
Former theatres in Libya
Organizations based in Tripoli, Libya